Valerie Lois "Val" Roberts (10 July 1938 – 23 August 2008) was an Australian gymnast. She competed at the 1960 and 1964 Olympics in all artistic gymnastics events and finished in 10th place with the Australian team in 1964. Her best individual result was 66th place on the balance beam in 1964. Her younger sister Jean Roberts is an Olympic discus thrower.

Personal life
Val married Ray Beitzel, a chemical engineer, and had two children: Matthew, and Felice.

References

1938 births
Gymnasts at the 1960 Summer Olympics
Gymnasts at the 1964 Summer Olympics
Olympic gymnasts of Australia
2008 deaths
Sportspeople from Ballarat
Australian female artistic gymnasts
21st-century Australian women